"Gang" (stylized as "GANG", Korean: 깡) is a song by South Korean singer Rain. It was released on December 1, 2017 by Rain Company as the lead single of his EP My Life.

Critical reception 
Kim Banya of IZM rated "Gang" 1.5 out of 5 stars. According to Kim, Rain should realize that it is 2017, not 2007, and that cute love songs fit his image, not powerful rap songs.

Charts

Covers and parodies 
"Gang" became a meme around May 2020 as many netizens made dance cover videos of it.

Remix 
"Gang Official Remix" is the remix of "Gang" by South Korean rappers Sik-K, pH-1, Jay Park, and Haon. It was released on June 4, 2020 by H1ghr Music.

Critical reception 
Kim Doheon of IZM rated "Gang Official Remix" 2 out of 5 stars. He added that he does not want to listen to "Gang" anymore if it is not to have a good laugh.

Charts

References 
2017 songs
Rain (entertainer) songs
Jay Park songs
Korean-language songs